Bat-and-ball games (or safe haven games) are field games played by two opposing teams. Action starts when the defending team throws a ball at a dedicated player of the attacking team, who tries to hit it with a bat and run between various safe areas in the field to score runs (points).  The defending team can use the ball in various ways against the attacking team's players to force them off the field when they are not in safe zones, and thus prevent them from further scoring. The best known modern bat-and-ball games are cricket and baseball, with common roots in the 18th-century games played in England.

The teams alternate between "batting" (offensive role), sometimes called "in at bat" or simply in, and "fielding" (defensive role), also called "out in the field" or out. Only the batting team may score, but teams have equal opportunities in both roles. The game is counted rather than timed. The action starts when a player on the fielding team (the "bowler" or "pitcher") puts the ball in play with a delivery whose restriction depends on the game. A player on the batting team attempts to strike the delivered ball, commonly with a "bat", which is a club whose dimensions and other aspects are governed by the rules of the game. If the ball is not fairly delivered to the batter (i.e. not thrown within his reach), then penalties generally occur that help the batting team score. 

The batter generally has an obligation to hit certain balls that are delivered within his reach (i.e. balls aimed at a designated area, known as the strike zone or wicket), and must hit the ball so that it is not caught by a fielder before it touches the ground. The most desirable outcome for the batter is generally to hit the ball out of the field, as this results in automatically scoring runs; however, in certain bat-and-ball games, this can result in a penalty against the batter. If the ball is struck into the field, then the batter may become a runner trying to reach a safe haven or "base"/"ground". While in contact with a base, the runner is "safe" from the fielding team and in a position to score runs. Leaving a safe haven places the runner in danger of being put out (eliminated). The teams switch roles when the fielding team 'puts out'/'gets out' enough of the batting team's players, which varies by game.

In modern baseball, the fielders put three players out. In cricket, they "dismiss" all players but one, though in some forms of cricket, there is a limit on the number of deliveries (scoring opportunities) that each team can have, such that the fielding team can become the batting team without getting anyone out. In many forms of early American baseball (townball, roundball), a single out ended the inning. Some games permit multiple runners and some have multiple bases to run in sequence. Batting may occur, and running begin (and potentially end), at one of the bases. The movement between those "safe havens" is governed by the rules of the particular sport. The game ends when the losing team has completed the maximum number of innings (batting/scoring turns), which may range from 1 (as in limited-overs cricket) to 9 (as in baseball) or more. Ties are generally broken (if at all) by allowing each team to have an additional turn to score.

Some variations of bat-and-ball games do not feature bats, with batters instead using parts of their bodies to hit the ball; these variations may also give the batter possession of the ball at the start of each play, eliminating the defensive team's role in starting the action. A prominent example of this is Baseball5, one of the main sporting disciplines governed by the World Baseball Softball Confederation along with baseball and softball.

History 

Cricket and rounders are some of the earliest bat-and-ball sports, and originated in England. Baseball appeared later in its modern form, having been shaped in America. Over time, several variations of baseball appeared in America, with some being informal (kickball) and others becoming professional sports in their own right (softball). In 1971, the ODI (One Day International) format of cricket was first played internationally; the ODI format shortened cricket from a five-day long game (Test cricket) to a one-day long game. In 2003, the T20 format of cricket was invented, further shortening the game to roughly 3 hours. And in 2017, an even shorter format of cricket, known as T10 cricket, was played in its first major tournament, the Abu Dhabi T10; T10 cricket lasts approximately 90 minutes. In the same year, a variation of baseball was invented by the World Baseball Softball Confederation known as Baseball5, which removes several elements of conventional baseball such as the pitcher and the bat. Baseball5 is similar to other baseball variants that have been historically played in different countries, such as cuatro esquinas in Cuba and punchball in America.

Types of bat-and-ball games 

There is a great deal of variation among bat-and-ball games; for example, more runs are generally scored in a cricket match than dozens of baseball games combined, and while a T10 cricket match generally ends in 90 minutes, a Test cricket batter may bat for hours over several consecutive days. Overall, most bat-and-ball games can be categorized as being baseball-like or cricket-like, with many of them following the same basic outline:

 Baseball-like games: The batter must generally "put the ball into play" by hitting it, generally into a limited area (i.e. "fair territory") of the field of play, before being able to run around the various safe havens. In many situations, runners (including the batter) are "forced" to advance to the next safe haven, with runners being put out when an opponent with the ball either touches the base they are forced to advance to before they do, or touches them while they are not safe. A run is scored when a runner reaches the final base, which is generally the fourth base, with the runner then leaving the field until their next turn as a batter.
The batter may have a limited number of attempts to hit the ball into the proper area of the field, with the risk of being out if they fail. Similarly, the pitcher (defensive player who delivers the ball) may be punished for throwing the ball out of the batter's reach too many times, with the batter then receiving a free pass to the first base.
Some variations of baseball, such as Tee-ball and Baseball5, do not feature a pitcher, with batters potentially automatically out for failing to legally hit the ball. 
 Cricket-like games: The ball is in play after being delivered regardless of whether or where to it is struck, meaning runs can be scored off of every delivery. A run is scored every time a batsman reaches a safe haven other than the one they were last in, with there being two safe havens, though the rules usually require that two batsmen do this (while crossing each other) for the run to be scored. Players from the batting team are dismissed when the ball touches the wicket in a safe haven with no batsman in it. 
 For games that are meant to be finished in a shorter time span, owing to the fact that it is often much more difficult to get batsmen out in cricket-like games than in baseball-like games, there is generally either a time limit (in which case neither team wins unless the game ends before the time limit) or a limit on how many legal deliveries each team needs to perform while fielding (e.g. each team may only have to deliver the ball a maximum of 100 times). Illegal deliveries are deliveries which are not within the batter's reach, or which are not delivered at a reasonable distance/angle to the batter.

Common features 

This list may not apply to all bat-and-ball games, but covers certain features common to many of them:

Running rules 
 Only the "first" player to reach a safe haven is protected by it (i.e. both batters can't stay in the same batsman's ground in cricket to avoid a runout, with the first of the two to have reached being the only one protected from being out. In a similar vein, in baseball, the player who initially reached a base can, until they reach the next base, generally return to that base to be safe, regardless of whether a teammate behind them on the basepath is also occupying that base). 
 Schlagball and Lapta (game) allow multiple runners at a safe haven.
 Runners may be called out for passing other runners; that is, if one runner improperly advances further around the safe havens than another runner. 
 In cricket, there is no such penalty.

Strategy 
 Batters have some latitude in terms of how far or when to run when scoring (i.e. a baseball batter may stop at 1st base or continue to 2nd if they desire, though their choice also depends on whether there is a runner at 2nd or 3rd; see Base running#Strategy), and this creates a risk-reward decision that could result in either more runs or more outs.
 Generally, the further the ball is hit from the fielders, the more time this affords for running and thus scoring.
 There may be decisions on where to place fielders (see Infield shift) in anticipation of where a batter may hit the ball, or decisions on how and who best to deliver the ball to the batter so as to prevent them from hitting it and scoring (see Bowling (cricket)#Bowling tactics).

Player roles 
 Substitution of players:
 Cricket does not allow substitution, except for fielders to temporarily leave the field.
 Other bat-and-ball games allow substitution, with baseball not permitting players who are substituted out to play any further role in the game.
 How batters alternate the batting:
 In cricket, the two safe havens are occupied at all times by one player each from the batting team. The ball is delivered to the player standing in one of the safe havens, with the two players being a batting pair that face all deliveries for their team until one of them is dismissed, at which point another player from the batting team comes to occupy the now-unoccupied safe haven.
 The batting order is not fixed, and a player who has been gotten out is eliminated from play until their team's turn to bat is over.
 In baseball and other sports, every time the batter tries to run to one of the bases, regardless of whether they safely reached or not, another batter comes in to bat.
 These games can have a fixed batting order, and players can bat unlimited times in an inning.
 How pitchers/bowlers alternate the delivering: In both baseball and cricket, any fielder can switch roles with the pitcher/bowler.
 In limited overs cricket, each bowler has a limited number of legal deliveries they can bowl. In addition, bowlers can swap only after they have bowled the 6 legal deliveries of the over.
It is very rare in the top levels of baseball for a fielder to switch positions with the pitcher, as pitching is a highly specialized skill. Instead, a new pitcher will typically come in from the bullpen whenever one is needed, and the previous pitcher will then exit the game. A position player may pitch during a blowout, in which the manager does not want to needlessly tire his pitchers, or if no pitchers remain available to enter the game, as sometimes occurs deep into extra innings.

Scoring 
 How runs are scored by running:
 In cricket, there is one player from the batting team in each safe haven, and one run is scored when both of these players swap safe havens. There is no limit to the number of runs they may score.
 In various baseball-like and Schlagball-like games, a runner must complete a full trip around all of the bases to score a run.
 Penalties for not properly touching the necessary safe havens when running:
 In cricket, it is considered a short run if a batsman doesn't touch the ground he is running towards, meaning the run does not score.
 In baseball, runners can be put out by an appeal play if they have not touched each base in the proper order.
 Alternative ways to score runs:
 A ball that is hit very far (such as to the edge of, or out of the field) through the air (such as a home run or six), or potentially in a specific area or place, such as in Bat-and-Trap, may automatically give the batting team some runs.

Elimination of batting players 
Ways for a batter to get out:
 When a batter hits a ball in the air that is caught by a fielder without bouncing, the fielding team gets closer to getting the batting team out, or otherwise receives an advantage.
 In baseball and cricket, catches get the batter out. 
 In early forms of baseball, the ball could bounce once before being caught. The "one hand, one bounce" rule of street cricket is similar.
 When a catch is made, any runs scored before the catch on that delivery are nullified, with any runners other than the batter potentially being at risk of being out as well (see Tagging up).
 In Schlagball, a one-handed catch taken "without bobbling" earns the fielding team a point.
 A fielder must remain within the field of play for the catch to be valid.
 The batter may have a "strike zone" or "wicket" in their batting area which they must bat the ball away from. (In baseball, 3 unhit deliveries in the strike zone get a batter out, while one ball hitting a batter's wicket gets them out in cricket).
 Ways for a runner/running player to get out:
 In baseball, there are certain situations where a runner is forced to go to a particular base. In these situations, the runner is out if a fielder holding the ball touches that base before the runner reaches it. 
 Situation #1: the batter must always advance to first base upon hitting the ball into fair territory.
 Situation #2: any runner must advance to the next base if they are on a base that a teammate must advance to.
 Situation #3: runners must return to their bases if the batter gets out because of a catch by a fielder.
 Another way for a runner to be put out in baseball is if they are not on a base when tagged by a fielder holding the ball.
 In cricket, a batter is dismissed while running if they attempt to score a run (by running towards the opposite crease line) and a fielder throws the ball at the wicket beyond the crease line before the batter crosses it.

Delivery of the ball 
 Penalties are rewarded to the batting team if the ball isn't delivered "fairly" to the batter (i.e. isn't thrown from far away enough, or is thrown out of the batter's reach) 
 In cricket, a run is awarded to the batting team if the ball is not delivered within the batter's reach, or if the bowler violates one of several rules while bowling the ball (such as bowling while the front foot is past the crease that the bowler is not supposed to cross).
 In addition to the extra run, unfair deliveries do not count towards the limited number of deliveries teams have to score off in certain forms of cricket. There are also fewer ways for a batter to get out on an illegal delivery. If the unfair delivery was a no-ball, then in certain forms of cricket, this results in the batters getting a free hit on the next delivery, meaning that there are also fewer ways for the batter to get out on the next delivery.
 In baseball, a pitch thrown out of the strike zone (which the batter doesn't swing at) is considered a ball. 4 balls result in the batter "walking" to first base, and if there are already runners on first base, second base, and third base, then this results in 1 run scoring. On rare occasion, a pitcher may walk 4 or more consecutive batters, resulting in the batting team scoring runs solely due to the 16 or more balls.
The ball may be delivered through the air to the batter, or it might bounce on the ground before reaching them. (See bowling (cricket))

Field 
 

In cricket and baseball, the playing field is large (at the highest levels of each sport, the minimum distance between the two furthest ends of the field is about ), and is divided into an infield and outfield (based on proximity to the batting area).

Cricket has the delivery and hitting of the ball done in the same area where the batters can run (the cricket pitch), while baseball does the running in a separate area.

Most bat-and-ball games have playing area in front of the batter (such as Schlagball), but may (like baseball) restrict batters from hitting the ball behind themselves or too far to the side; see foul territory.

Bat-and-ball sports can be modified to be played in an indoor court. For example, indoor cricket takes place in a  facility, while Baseball5 is played on a -square field.

Fielding positions
In baseball-like games, the fielders (also known as "position players") operate in a standard set of baseball positions because it is generally possible to cover most of the field by spacing the fielders out in certain ways. By contrast, the significantly larger cricket field has many possible cricket fielding positions, with the 11 fielders occupying the slips cordon behind the batter, or other areas of the field.

Game length 
T20 cricket and baseball both last about 3 hours, while other forms of cricket can last either multiple days or less than three hours. Informal bat-and-ball games may take place in shorter periods of time, and in general, the possibility of a team's batters getting out rapidly in succession makes it theoretically possible for certain periods of play in most bat-and-ball games to end quicker than usual, with the opposite also being possible in some cases. Both baseball and cricket can theoretically go forever, since baseball games end only after a certain number of outs and innings in cricket can be prolonged by illegal deliveries; however, in limited overs cricket, fielding teams are penalized if they do not bowl enough legal deliveries at a certain rate, which essentially imposes a time limit of sorts on these types of games.
 The game may be played for a certain number of innings.
 There can potentially be time restrictions (as in Test cricket), or the possibility of a game being suspended and resumed at a later date if necessary.
 The trailing team can end up batting more times than the other team and still lose, potentially because it was forced to do so by the other team. 
 There may be no restriction on the number of innings, deliveries, or time.

Pace of play 
In some bat-and-ball sports, there are team penalties designed to ensure the game goes at a faster pace. For example, in various formats of cricket, there are over rate penalties which kick in if a team has bowled too few deliveries within an allotted amount of time, while in some baseball leagues, there is a pitch clock that penalizes batters and pitchers for taking too much time between pitches.

Result 
Bat-and-ball games are played until:
 In baseball and Timeless Test cricket, the trailing team must complete all of its scheduled batting turns.
 5-day Test cricket also has the potential of a draw, which occurs when time runs out before the non-leading team(s) complete all of their batting turns, thus effectively yielding no result for the game.
 In bete-ombro and early forms of baseball, a game can be played until either team scores a certain number of runs.

Ties can be dealt with in several ways:
 The tie may simply be considered a tie.
 An additional inning(s), either full-size or abbreviated, may be added to the game, with this potentially repeating until the tie is broken.
 Cricket has a Super Over of at most 6 additional legal deliveries per team.
 Baseball has extra innings.

Run chases 
When one of the teams is not leading and only they have completed all of their allotted batting turns, this allows the other team to win automatically by surpassing the number of runs scored by the first team. In cricket, this situation is referred to as a "run chase", with the "target" of the batting team being the number of runs scored by the other team plus one. In baseball, the home team can be considered to be chasing, with the aim of scoring the "walk-off" (winning) runs, when they are not leading anytime after the eighth inning, as a regulation game sees the trailing team bat at least nine times and the teams alternating the batting, with the home team always batting last.

Margin of victory 

In addition to the number of runs a team won by over their opponents, other factors which are relevant to determining which team wins, such as the number of outs or legal deliveries that were remaining in the batting team's turn (if they won/there was a limit on either resource), can be included with the statement of the result. The result may also mention how many more times the losing team batted than the winning team.

Shortened games 
In some circumstances (e.g. bad weather), a complete game may not be possible in its originally envisioned timeframe because of weather or other reasons. In baseball-like games, which generally have many innings, it is possible to call the result of a game after both teams have batted only a few of their scheduled turns, or otherwise to finish/replay the game at a later date. In cricket, however, which is generally played to only one or two batting turns per team, a match may not be callable for the simple reason that only one of the teams has had the chance to score so far. However, cricket matches that are interrupted by rain can still be considered completable so long as there is enough time left in the match to allow the second-batting team to face a sufficiently long batting turn; in these circumstances, a rain rule is applied such that any runs scored by the first-batting team are usually devalued.

Terminology 

Here are some terms or concepts common to many bat-and-ball games:

 The person who delivers the ball to the batter: the bowler, pitcher 
 The main fielder behind the batter: the catcher, wicketkeeper
 Getting the batter out by delivering the ball at something near the batter, when the batter doesn't hit the ball: strike out, bowled
 The act of getting the batter or runner out when they are not in a safe haven:
 If the ball is thrown at the runner: plugging, soaking (see Schlagball)
 If a fielder touches the runner with ball in hand: tagout
 If a fielder gets the ball to the safe haven before the runner does: force out, runout 
 getting a batter out by catching the ball when hit in the air by the batter: fly out, caught out 
 The points both teams score: runs
 The safe havens: base, ground
 A ball hit out of the field of play through the air: home run, six

Equipment
 Bat: generally resembles the round shape of a baseball bat or the flat shape of the larger cricket bat. Other designs include something similar to a hockey stick or a spoon (see wicket (sport)). 
 Ball: Often about as large as a cricket ball.
 Can be very hard, or softer, like in tennis ball cricket.
 Protective equipment for the batter and/or fielders, ranging from helmets to gloves.

In the field, there may be:
 Physical markers for the safe havens (such as bases, wickets, and lines like the crease (cricket)) 
 Physical markers for the "strike zone" near the batter (see the target in Vitilla) 
 A physical boundary for the field (see the fence in baseball)

Informal variants

Bat-and-ball games can be played with modified rules in unorthodox places, such as in the street or the backyard. Oftentimes, players are forbidden or penalized for hitting the ball out of the field into an area where it would be hard to reach, and play may be modified so as to ensure all players have an opportunity to participate, such as in Kwik cricket.

Tournaments
At the international level, the World Baseball Classic is the premier baseball tournament. For cricket, the ODI World Cup, ICC T20 World Cup, and ICC World Test Championship are the premier tournaments. The Pesäpallo World Cup is played every 3 years.

At the domestic level, baseball tends to be played in leagues with 2 major divisions, with the playoffs being contested in a best-of-seven format. T20 leagues in cricket tend to have 6 to 8 teams and follow the Page playoff system (two semi-finals, with an additional match played to determine which team enters the second semi-final, followed by a final).

List of bat-and-ball games
Notable bat-and-ball games include:

Mainstream sports
 Baseball – has four bases
 Softball

 Cricket – has two wickets (within two batsmen's grounds)
 Test cricket
 First-class cricket
 Limited-overs cricket
 One Day International
 List-A cricket
 Short form cricket
 Twenty20
 Twenty20 International
 100-ball cricket
 T10 cricket
 Indoor cricket
 Indoor cricket (UK variant)
 Blind cricket
 Club cricket

Other games
 Bat-and-Trap
 Gilli Danda
 Oina 
 Schlagball - also called Deutschball, "German ball"
 Old Cat (One old cat, Two old cat, etc.) – variable
 Pärk

Similar to baseball
 16-inch softball – Softball with a squishy, 16-inch ball
 British Baseball – four posts
 Brännboll – four bases
 Corkball – four bases (no base-running)
 Elle
 Extreme Baseball a.k.a. Double Diamond Baseball
 Fuzzball (sport)
 Indian Ball
 The Massachusetts Game – four bases
 Over-the-Line
 Palant
 Pesäpallo – four bases
 Rounders – four bases or posts run counterclockwise
 Stickball – can be variable
 T-Ball
 Town ball – can be variable
 Vitilla - three bases
 Wiffle ball
 Wireball

Similar to cricket
 Backyard cricket
 Bete-ombro 
 Crocker (sport)
 French cricket 
 Kilikiti
 Kwik cricket
 Plaquita 
 Single wicket cricket
 Stoolball
 Vigoro – two wickets

Similar to Schlagball
 Lapta – two salos (bases)
 Danish longball

Hybrid bat-and-ball games
 Composite rules Softball-Baseball – a hybrid bat-and-ball sports which combines the elements of Baseball and Softball, played on the large identical baseball diamond with the larger ball, ten rather than nine innings, and allowing pitching the ball either underarm, overarm, or sidearm.
 Composite rules Baseball-Cricket – a hybrid bat-and-ball games combining elements of baseball and cricket, played by two teams of 12 players with the 9-inch diameter baseball on the oval-shaped field about 220 yards long by 176 yards wide, at the center of which is a baseball field about 92 feet apart with the rectangular 66 feet 6 inch by 12 feet pitching area  roughly at a distance between the pitcher and 2 batters (consists of the striking batter and non-striking batter), equidistant between first and third base, and a few feet closer to home plate than to second base. The objective is one batter (striking batter) on and at the right batter's box is pitched to, other batter (non-striking batter) stands on the left batter's box, then the striking batter must hit it and batter must runs around the bases in the normal counterclockwise direction, while the non-striking batter runs around bases in a clockwise direction at the same time. The game could last 12 innings of 5 overs.

Games without a bowler/pitcher

Gilli Danda 

Gilli Danda (which is related to several other traditional games in other parts of the world) is an Indian game with similarities to baseball and cricket. The aim of the game is for the batter to knock a stick on the ground up into the air using a stick held in the hand, and then to hit the airborne stick as far as possible. The batter is out if the stick is caught by a player on the other team before it touches the ground. Points are earned either based on the distance the stick travels, or by the batter running to a designated area while the fielders collect the batted stick and throw it back to the hitting area to try to get the batter out. The game ends after each team has batted once, with each team batting until all of its players are out.

Non-bat-and-ball games 
Striking the ball with a "bat" or any type of stick, or having the defensive team deliver the ball to the batter, is not crucial. These games use the foot or hand to hit the ball, and make it significantly easier to hit the ball overall, either by placing significant restrictions on the way the defensive team delivers the ball to the batter, or by giving the batter possession of the ball at the start of each play. Otherwise their rules may be similar or even identical to baseball or cricket. The first two use a large (35 cm) soft ball.

Using the legs:
 Kickball – four bases, sometimes called soccer baseball
 Matball – kickball with gym mats for bases
 Leg cricket - two batsmen's grounds, foot used to propel the ball rather than a bat
Using the hands:
 Baseball5 - four bases, played at an international level (batter starts each play with ball)
 Punchball – four bases, sometimes called volleyball-style baseball or slug
Involving throwing:

 Stoop ball - ball is thrown against the steps of a stairway, and fielding is done on the rebound

Related games 
Some features common to most bat-and-ball games are also present in other games. For example, there are several variations of tag (such as kho-kho and kabaddi) which also feature the concept of teams taking turns on offense and defense, with players attempting to tag opponents to get them out. (Baseball, one of the main bat-and-ball games, also features players trying to tag opponents to get them out). Two of these tag variants, atya-patya and surr, also have offensive players score points (or otherwise help their team win) based on how far they can advance (based on progression from one safe area to the next, with each safe area being a place out of the reach of the defenders) without being tagged out by the defensive players.

See also
Comparison of baseball and cricket, the two largest bat-and-ball sports

References

External links
 Project Protoball
 Johnball
 Best Youth Baseball Bat 2016